Anoploceras is a genus of  Middle and Upper Triassic nautiloids included in the Tainoceratidae, known from eastern Europe. The shell is evolute with only a slight overlap of previous whorls. Whorl section is subquadrate, like Pleuronautilus, only depressed. Flanks have conspicuous ribs that may be somewhat sinuous.

Holconautilus has a more rounded venter, and flanks, and is more evolute. Enoploceras has weaker ribs that expand into nodes on the umbilical and ventro-lateral shoulders, and a small umbilical perforation. Encoiloceras has strong ribbing, a large umbilical perforation, and a shallow groove along the venter.

References

 Bernhard Kummel, 1964.  Nautiloidea-Nautilida. Treatise on Invertebrate Paleontology, Part K. Geological Soc. of America and University of Kansas press. Teichert and Moore (eds)

Prehistoric nautiloid genera
Middle Triassic first appearances
Late Triassic extinctions